Lyon College is a private liberal arts college affiliated with the Presbyterian Church and located in Batesville, Arkansas. Founded in 1872 as Arkansas College, it is the oldest independent college in Arkansas.

History
Located in Batesville, Arkansas, the college was founded in 1872 and is the oldest independent college in Arkansas.

 In 1871, state leaders narrowed down choices for the potential flagship location of a state college to either Fayetteville or Batesville. Fayetteville and Washington County residents collaboratively offered financial backing to establish the college in Fayetteville, and Batesville ultimately lost the bid. However, Rev. Isaac J. Long, along with others involved with the Presbyterian church, decided to open their own college there soon after, which they named Arkansas College at Batesville. The charter was signed by Governor Ozra Amander Hadley on October 24, 1872.  Morrow Hall was the college's first permanent building, occupied in 1873.

The Long family led the college until Dr. Paul M. McCain became president of the college in 1952. It was renamed Lyon College in 1994, after the Lyon family of Arkansas. Frank Lyon Sr. served on the board of trustees from 1946 to 1988, including as chairman from 1977 to 1987. Frank Lyon Jr. served on the board for more than 30 years, until his death in 2015. He served as chair of the board for four years. Frank Lyon Jr. and Jane Lyon gave the largest gift in the college's history of $10 million.

W. Joseph King became president in July 2017.
King succeeded Donald V. Weatherman, who served as president from 2009 until he retired in 2017. Melissa Taverner was named provost in February 2018.  After King's resignation in 2021, Taverner succeeded him as president.

Academics 
Lyon College is classified among "Baccalaureate Colleges: Arts & Sciences Focus".  In 2019, the college was listed at #50 on the "Top Performers of Social Mobility" published by U.S. News & World Report. As of 2020, Lyon College was ranked #164-#215 among "National Liberal Arts Colleges" U.S. News & World Report.

Campus
 The college was originally located in the "downtown" block that the First Presbyterian Church of Batesville now occupies. In the 1920s, the college moved to East End Heights neighborhood, which was  later known as the middle campus. The college added more buildings in between 1991 and 1994, including the Holloway Theatre, Lyon Business and Economics Building, President's Residence, Bradley Manor, Upper Division Residence Hall, and Young House. The Derby Center for Science and Mathematics was completed in December 2003, followed by the Kelley Baseball Complex, in January 2004. The size of the current campus is 136 acres.

In October 2010, a fire damaged the Edwards Commons Dining Hall. The building was named after John W. Edwards and Lucille Welman Edwards, who originally funded the building. Reconstruction of the building began in October 2011. Lyon college added two new residence halls, named Whiteside and Wilson, in October 2015.

The campus includes an 18-hole disc golf course that is open to the public.

Student life
Student enrollment was 655, all undergraduate, as of 2019.

Lyon College has a Scottish Heritage Program that provides scholarships and hosts the Arkansas Scottish Festival every April. The program also started a campus pipe band that includes Lyon College students, faculty, and staff, along with volunteer musicians from Batesville and surrounding areas. The pipe band has performed locally in Arkansas as well as in Scotland.

The college adopted a pet-friendly policy in January 2018 that allows students to own pets while living in the on-campus dormitories. It began offering obedience classes for animals and animal-friendly facilities, including a coffee shop and a dog park called the Schram Bark Park.

The college has a student-run honor code and a freshman orientation system that runs from before the start of freshman year until the end of the first year.

Lyon College has a fully endowed two-week study abroad program called the Nichols Program.

In 2019, Lyon College initiated an Army Reserve Officers' Training Corps (ROTC) program and Military Science and Leadership concentration. The program is an affiliate of the Arkansas State University ROTC program.

Former radio station
From 1976 through 1981, the then-Arkansas College operated a low power "Class D" educational FM radio station, KGED, transmitting on 88.1 MHz. Its studio was in the lower level of the Mabee-Simpson library building and the transmitter was located on the upper level of Brown Chapel, with the broadcast antenna inside the steeple. Broadcasting was sporadic over the years and an attempt was made to revive operations in the fall semester of 1981 by freshman station manager Kevin Manzer. However, operations ceased permanently later that same year when the transmitter failed and was deemed not repairable by the station engineer, Dick Treat.

Athletics
The Lyon athletic teams are called the Scots. The college is a member of the Division III level of the National Collegiate Athletic Association (NCAA), primarily competing as an NCAA D-III Independent since the 2022–23 academic year. The Scots previously competed in the American Midwest Conference (AMC) of the National Association of Intercollegiate Athletics (NAIA) from 2012–13 to 2022–23; in the TranSouth Athletic Conference (TranSouth or TSAC) from 1997–98 to 2011–12; as an NAIA Independent from 1995–96 to 1996–97; and in the defunct Arkansas Intercollegiate Conference (AIC) from about 1980–81 to 1994–95.

Lyon competes in 21 intercollegiate varsity sports: Men's sports include baseball, basketball, cross country, football, golf, soccer, track & field and wrestling; while women's sports include basketball, cross country, golf, soccer, softball, track & field, volleyball and wrestling; and co-ed sports include archery, competitive cheer, competitive dance, eSports and shooting sports. Former sports included men's lacrosse.

Wrestling
In January 2014, the college added men's and women's wrestling to its athletic offerings.

Football

Football was added in 2015, which prompted the construction of new residence halls and a 5,500 sq foot field house. The Lyon College football team competed in the Sooner Athletic Conference of the NAIA.

Esports
The college is the only member of National Association of Collegiate Esports in the state of Arkansas. Kevin Jenkins is the athletic director.

Intramurals
The college also fields an intramural sports program.

Move to NCAA Division III
On February 8, 2022, the school announced that it planned to transition its athletic programs from the NAIA to NCAA Division III, with any conference home yet to be determined.

On August 22, 2022, Lyon received an invitation to join the St. Louis Intercollegiate Athletic Conference (SLIAC), starting in the 2023–24 school year.

Notable people

Judd Deere 
Served as White House press assistant for Donald J. Trump. He was recently subpoenaed by the January 6th committee investing the January 6th insurrection.

References

External links

 
 Official athletics website

 
Batesville, Arkansas
Education in Independence County, Arkansas
Educational institutions established in 1872
Liberal arts colleges in Arkansas
1872 establishments in Arkansas
Universities and colleges affiliated with the Presbyterian Church (USA)
Private universities and colleges in Arkansas